A coin wrapper, sometimes known as a bank roll or roll, is a paper or plastic container for a number of coins. In the 19th century, coins were distributed in large cloth bags and coins were hand wrapped. Since the onset of the 20th century, coin wrapping machines have been in use. The earliest patent for a coin wrapping machine was in 1901. By 1910, automatic coin counting machines were in use, which could reject counterfeit coins, wrap coins, and crimp the coin wrapper ends.

History
In the 19th century coins were collected in cloth bags after they were struck at the mint. Initially coin wrapping was done by hand. In 1913 the Federal Reserve bank was created. After the creation of the Federal Reserve, bags of coins were sent to the individual reserve banks. Each branch then put the coins into paper wrappers with tightly sealed ends. These rolls were called (OBW) "Original Bank-Wrapped Rolls". When other banks wrapped the coins they would print their bank name on the wrapper.

Coin wrapping machines

On 22, June 1901 James Rice applied for a patent (number 720070) for what he called a "Coin Bunching Machine". The patent was issued on 10 February 1903. Rice described his invention by stating that it was a "efficient manner means for bunching together any preferred number of coins of a selected denomination and holding them in position whereby they may be very conveniently and expeditiously wrapped or covered with a paper jacket." 

On 9, November 1907 Erskine W Jennings applied for a patent on a machine he called "Coin Wrapper" which could crimp the ends of the coin rolls. On 3 August 1909 he was granted patent number 930,291. The machine was still not fully automatic.

Automatic coin wrapping machines
By October of 1908 the first fully automatic coin wrapping machine was created and a patented was applied for. The Automatic Coin-Wrapping Machine Company applied for a patent on the machine and it was granted October of 1910:Patent number number #973335. The applicant of record was Charles S. Batdorf; a man who applied for many coin related machine patents as early as his 1890 (Coin Operated Apparatus). In 1908 he was granted patent number 358,670 for a "Spurious Coin Detector". A machine which he said could, "Provide a means whereby bogus, spurious or counterfeit coins will be rejected by the machine automatically even though they be of the same size as the genuine coins of the value for which the machine is designed to operate."

By 1911 banks in the United States were using coin rolling machines. Some banks began to use standardized paper colors based on denomination. The machines were capable of culling counterfeit and damaged coins.

Modern coin wrapping
In the United States, empty rolls are available free at most banks in every denomination (though it is becoming increasingly difficult for half dollar and dollar to be readily made available).
The rolls come flat and one side will have to be folded to allow for coins to be placed inside. When the roll is full, the top side will need to be folded. Typically, the full rolls are brought back to the banks in exchange for currency or to be deposited. The Royal Canadian Mint uses check weighers to verify the number of coins per roll.

In the Eurozone, empty plastic rolls are used at banks in every denomination, with five-coin staggered rows. The five-coin rows and transparency make quick verification of contents possible, with a high degree of certainty. This results in less time spent processing coins, while the solidity and two-way closure system increase the number of times the coin roll can be used, effectively reducing its overall cost.

In Japan, machine-wrapped, plastic coin rolls are circulated almost exclusively, as handmade coin rolls are rare. Each roll holds 50 coins. Customers can change bills into coin rolls easily using automatic money changers at Japanese banks.

In the United Kingdom, coin rolls are not used. Instead, small plastic bags are provided free of charge at banks which are filled by the customer with the appropriate number of the same value coin as printed on the bag, with these bags also provided by banks when withdrawing amounts of money in coins. When depositing or changing, the bags are weighed at the bank to check they contain the right number.

Searching coin rolls
Often, coin collectors will ask for full rolls from the bank to search the contents in hopes of finding an interesting or valuable coin. Some collectors also save coins of bullion value, such as copper pennies and silver half-dollars. This practice is called coin roll hunting. It is also known as cherry picking. Full rolls are also requested by vendors to make change. Some coin roll hunters look for Mint-made errors such as double die coins. The error coins often have a high numismatic value to coin collectors.

Fraud
Bank rolls are vulnerable to a variety of scams, such as rolling slugs of no value or coins of a lesser value. In 2018 a scammer in Canada hid washers in coin rolls which were supposed to contain two dollar coins.

Amount in a roll in various countries

Afghanistan
Currency: Afghan afghani

Albania
Currency: Albanian lek

Argentina
Currency: Argentine peso

Australia
Currency: Australian dollar
Australian coins used to have different ink colors, but now they all have black ink.

Austria
Currency: Austrian schilling

Bahamas
Currency: Bahamian dollar
The Bahamas has two different kinds of rolls with the same number of coins. One kind is distinguished by color, while the other is adorned with a light blue background with the Flag of the Bahamas. The rolls here are the ones distinguished by color.

Bahrain
Currency: Bahraini dinar

Belgium
Currency: Belgian franc

Bulgaria
Currency: Bulgarian lev

Canada
Currency: Canadian dollar
Canadian coin rolls are very similar to American coin rolls, with the exception being that rolls for the half dollar do not exist while rolls for the toonie do.

China, People's Republic
Currency: Renminbi

Comoros
Currency: Comorian franc

Cyprus
Currency: Cypriot pound

Denmark
Currency: Danish krone

Ecuador
Currency: Ecuadorian sucre

Egypt
Currency: Egyptian pound

Eurozone
Currency: Euro

Ireland
Unlike the rest of the eurozone, Ireland uses clear, reusable plastic bags for all denominations.

Spain
Three of the rolls used in Spain are different from the ones used in the rest of the eurozone.

Italy
Until 2009, two of the rolls used in Italy were different from the ones used in the rest of the eurozone.

Federal Republic of Germany
Currency: German (Deutsche) Mark

Fiji
Currency: Fijian dollar

Finland
Currency: Finnish mark

France
Currency: French franc

Greece
Currency: Greek drachma

Honduras
Currency: Honduran lempira

Hungary
Currency: Hungarian forint

Iceland
Currency: Icelandic króna

Indonesia
Currency: Indonesian rupiah

Israel
Currency: Israeli new shekel

Italy
Currency: Italian lira

Japan
Currency: Japanese yen

Japanese coin rolls are made of plastic and are not color-differentiated. Each roll holds 50 coins. Older coin rolls were made out of paper.

Lebanon
Currency: Lebanese pound

Lithuania
Currency: Lithuanian litas

Malawi
Currency: Malawian kwacha

Mexico
Currency: Mexican peso

Moldova
Currency: Moldovan leu

Morocco
Currency: Moroccan dirham

Netherlands
Currency: Dutch guilder

New Zealand
Currency: New Zealand dollar

Norway
Currency: Norwegian krone

Oman
Currency: Omani rial

Panama
Currency: Panamanian balboa

Papua New Guinea
Currency: Papua New Guinean kina

Peru
Currency: Peruvian sol

Philippines
Currency: Philippine peso

Portugal
Currency: Portuguese escudo

Romania
Currency: Romanian leu

San Marino
Currency: Sammarinese lira

Saudi Arabia
Currency: Saudi riyal

Serbia
Currency: Serbian dinar

Seychelles
Currency: Seychellois rupee

Singapore
Currency: Singaporean dollar

South Korea
Currency: South Korean won

Soviet Union
Currency: Soviet rouble

Sweden
Currency: Swedish krona

Switzerland
Currency: Swiss franc

Taiwan
Currency: New Taiwan dollar

Thailand
Currency: Thai baht

Trinidad and Tobago
Currency: Trinidad and Tobago dollar

Turkmenistan
Currency: Turkmen manat

Uganda
Currency: Ugandan shilling

Ukraine
Currency: Ukrainian hryvnia

United Arab Emirates
Currency: United Arab Emirates dirham

United Kingdom
Currency: Sterling
The UK generally uses clear, reusable plastic bags in which a given quantity of coins is weighed. As the UK has traditionally relied on weight when counting coins, a conscious effort was made to ensure that the weight of 1p, 2p, 5p & 10p coins remained constant following the changes to their composition (from copper to copper-plated steel in 1992 for the 1p & 2p, and the 2008 change from copper-nickel to nickel-clad steel for the 5p & 10p coins). Relative densities of the respective metals meant that the thickness of the later coins was increased to maintain the coin's weight, thereby making coin rolls impractical; the differences in thicknesses are more notable in the 5p & 10p coins.

The proportional dimensions of pre-decimal coins continued past Decimal Day, meaning that the 2p and 10p coins weighed twice the 1p and 5p respectively; this correlation was continued when the 5p (1990) and 10p (1992) coins were reduced in size, leading to the situation that full bags of 1p and 2p coins, and 5p and 10p coins, have the same weight, and whilst banks discourage mixed coinage, it is possible to mix these denominations.

United States
Currency: United States dollar

Each denomination has a different amount found in a roll and are color-coded by denomination. See below:

In the United States, it is also common for coin dealers and online bullion shops to produce their own rolls of pre-1965 silver coinage for the purpose of selling them to customers; these rolls may be the same size and face value as those produced by banks, or may exist in half, full and double sizes.

Venezuela
Currency: Venezuelan bolívar

Vietnam
Currency: Vietnamese đồng

Yemen
Currency: Yemeni rial

See also

Coin roll hunting, the practice of searching coin rolls for unusual, rare or valuable coins
Coin rolling scams
Currency packaging
Euro starter kits

References

External links
Video - Hand rolling coins
Video - Coin Counting, Sorting, and Wrapping machine

Banking
Numismatics